Michael Smith (born 1946) is a British author and journalist specialising in the history of polar exploration.

Early life
Michael Smith was born in 1946 and raised in London.

Career 
Smith began writing about Antarctic and Arctic exploration after a successful career as an award-winning journalist in London. He was twice named Industrial Journalist of the Year (1987 and 1992). He is a Life Member of the National Union of Journalists.

From 1978–1989, Smith worked at The Guardian as an industrial editor, political correspondent and transport editor. From 1990–91 he worked at  The Standard as a city editor. From 1992–95 he worked at The Observer (1992–95) as industrial editor and business editor.

Michael Smith's first book, An Unsung Hero - Tom Crean was a notable success when first published in 2000 and became the No 1 best-selling non-fiction book in Ireland. The biography of Tom Crean was responsible for raising awareness of the role played by Irishmen in the history of Polar exploration. A subsequent adaptation of the book for children (Tom Crean - Iceman) led to the story of Tom Crean being included on the national curriculum in Irish schools. Michael Smith has also written biographies of Captain Lawrence Oates, Sir James Wordie and Francis Crozier. He also chronicled the role of lesser known Irish explorers, including Edward Bransfield, Patrick Keohane, Robert Forde and Tim and Mortimer McCarthy. Michael Smith's biography of Sir Ernest Shackleton was published in October 2014. Michael Smith has appeared in a number of television factual documentaries. He also wrote and presented a series about Irish explorers for RTE Radio. Michael Smith has lectured extensively. Venues include: Athy Heritage Museum, Athy; Seamus Ennis Cultural Centre, Naul; National Maritime Museum, Cornwall; National Museum of Ireland, Dublin; Pitlochry Festival Theatre, Pitlochry; Queen's Gallery, Buckingham Palace, London; Queen's University, Belfast; Royal Geographical Society, London; Stables Theatre, Hastings; University College, Cork; White-Oates Museum, Selborne.

Books 
 An Unsung Hero – Tom Crean, (The Collins Press; Hodder Headline; The Mountaineers Press), 2000  
 I Am Just Going Outside – Captain Oates – Antarctic Tragedy (The Collins Press; Spellmount) 2002 
 Polar Crusader – A Life of Sir James Wordie (Birlinn) 2004  
 Tom Crean – An Illustrated Life (The Collins Press) 2006  
 Captain Francis Crozier - Last Man Standing? (The Collins Press) 2006  
 Great Endeavour – Ireland's Antarctic Explorers (The Collins Press) 2008  
 Shackleton - By Endurance We Conquer (The Collins Press and Oneworld Publications)2014

Children's books 
 Tom Crean – Iceman (The Collins Press) 2003  
 Shackleton – The Boss (The Collins Press) 2004

Contributory author 
 Shackleton – The Antarctic and Endurance (Dulwich College) 2001

References

External links 

Living people
1946 births
British writers